The 2021 Chicago Fire FC season was the club's 26th year of existence, as well as their 24th in Major League Soccer. This was the Fire's first season with fans in Soldier Field since 2005 (the Fire had officially moved in 2020, however fans were not allowed in Soldier Field due to the pandemic). The Fire would fail to qualify for the playoffs for the fourth season in a row. Head coach Raphael Wicky was ultimately relieved of his position on September 30, with Assistant Coach Frank Klopas taking over on an interim basis.

Current squad 
As of November 1, 2021

Player movement

In

Out

Loaned Out

Unsigned Draft Picks and Trialists

Technical staff

Match results

Preseason

Regular season

Squad Statistics 
Note: Italics indicate the player left the squad or was loaned out and hasn't returned from loan

Games Played

Goalkeeping Statistics

Goalscoring and Assisting Record

References

External links 
 

Chicago Fire FC seasons
Chicago Fire Soccer Club
Chicago Fire
Chicago Fire